Goskino USSR is the abbreviated name for the USSR State Committee for Cinematography (Государственный комитет по кинематографии СССР) in the Soviet Union. It was a central state directory body of Soviet film production.

History
The first main film production and distribution organisation in the Russian Soviet Federative Socialist Republic until 1924 was Goskino; this was succeeded by Sovkino from 1924 to 1930, and then replaced with Soyuzkino in 1930 chaired by Martemyan Ryutin, which had jurisdiction over the entire USSR until 1933, when it was then replaced by GUKF (The Chief Directorate of the Film and Photo Industry, largely headed by Boris Shumyatsky); which, again, was replaced in 1939 by the Central Committee for Cinema Affairs until 1946, when it was replaced by the Ministry of the Cinema.

The responsible heads of Soviet Cinema: 
 1919–1921 Dmitry Ilyich Leshchenko (head of the photo-film department of the People's Commissariat for Education) 
 1921–1922 Pyotr Ivanovich Voevodin (head of the photo-film department of the People's Commissariat for Education) 
 1922–1923 Lev Arkadyevich Lieberman (head of the State Committee for Cinematography) 
 1923–1925 Erasmus Samuilovich Kadomtsev (Chairman of the Board of the State Film Agency) 
 1925–1927 Stefan Alekseevich Bala-Dobrov (director of the State Film Agency) 
 1926–1929 Konstantin Matveyevich Shvedchikov (Chairman of the Board of Sovkino) 
 1929–1930 Jan Ernestovich Rudzutak (Chairman of the Film Committee)
 1930–1930 Martemyan Nikitich Ryutin (Chairman of the Board of Soyuzkino)
 1930–1938 Boris Zakharovich Shumyatsky
 1938–1939 Semyon Semyonovich Dukelsky
 1939–1953 Ivan Grigorievich Bolshakov

Goskino 
Subsequently, in 1963 Goskino USSR was created by the decree of the Presidium of the Supreme Soviet of USSR on March 23, 1963, as the State Committee of the Council of Ministers of the USSR on Cinematography. From 1965 to 1972, its name was simplified to the Committee on Cinematography of the Council of Ministers. From 1972 to 1978, the committee regained its original name. From 1978, until its dissolution in 1991, it was called the State Committee of the USSR on Cinematography.

In 1991 Goskino USSR was abolished by a statement of the State Council USSR of November 14, 1991 (No. ГС-13).

Presidents of Goskino 

 1963–1972 Alexei Romanov
 1972–1986 Fililp Ermash
 1986–1991 Aleksandr Kamshalov

Reanimation
In 1992 the Roskino/Roskomkino was created, which was later renamed into the State Committee of Russian Federation for Cinematography (Государственный комитет Российской Федерации по кинематографии) in the modern Russia as the supreme government organ in charge of filmmaking. Both performed general management and censorship functions. Roskino was disestablished in May 2008, after Vladimir Putin's decree N 867.

References

State Committees of the Soviet Union
Film organizations in the Soviet Union
Cinematography, State Committee of
1991 disestablishments in the Soviet Union
State-owned film companies